Sarò libera is the second solo album by Italian singer Emma Marrone, published on September 20, 2011 by Universal. The album is preceded by the eponymous single "Sarò libera", released September 2, 2011 and subsequently certified Gold disc.
The album reached the highest position as the #43 Switzerland in the Swiss Music Charts, remaining there for eight weeks, and came straight to Number 1 in Italy, with the two versions.

After Marrones participation in the Sanremo Music Festival 2012, on February 15, 2012  a new edition of the album was published, called Sanremo Edition, with a dual version of "Non è l'inferno", a song that won the festival, and a cover of "Nel blu dipinto di blu".

The single "Non è l'inferno", certified disc multiplatinum, debuted straight to 1st place in Italy while Switzerland reaches the 19th position. The fourth single, "Cercavo amore", was certified Platinum disc.

The fifth single from the album was "Maledetto quel giorno", the soundtrack of the campaign Hyundai i20 Sound Edition. On November 11, the website of Il Corriere della Sera released a preview of the music video of the song, not as a single statement, "Non sono solo te", included in Sarò libera, of which Emma is both producer and Screenwriter.

The album  Sarò libera  was certified double platinum by the Federation of the Italian Music Industry.

Track listing

Standard edition

Sanremo edition

Charts

Sarò libera Tour 

From July 10, 2012 Emma Marrone was on tour with the Sarò libera Tour. A single date abroad was in London on 8 in October 2012, at Koko Club.   Sarò libera Tour sold more than 160,000 tickets (excluding stages with free admission) and sold out in almost every concert.
  
The track list, the scenery and the arrangements of the songs between Tour summer and winter have been modified. In the Tour winter, as well as most rock and impetuous already shown in Tour summer, the singer said he wanted to show even the most intimate. Since the beginning of Tour winter brought the singer of songs played personally with their guitar(The Gretsch White Falcon) and personally created some videos of story; In band there was the inclusion of Arianna Mereu the first part of the tour, while the winter version there were two new entries, Elena Floris the violin and Claudia Della Gatta to cello.

Setlist 
Intro voice Emma
”Tra passione e lacrime”
”Ti capita mai”
”Resta ancora un po'”
”Colori”
”Purché tua”
”Sarò libera”
”Con le nuvole”
”L'amore che ho”
”Davvero”
”Io son per te l'amore”
”Acqua e ghiaccio”
”Nel blu dipinto di blu”
”Medley: Cullami”/Da quando mi hai lasciato tu/Dove finisce la notte
”Protagonista”
”Arida”
”Dalle vene”
”Maledetto quel giorno”
”Non è l'inferno”
”Calore”
”Arriverà” (version without the Modà)
”Scusa se vado via”
”Cercavo amore”

Setlist Tour winter
Video presentation
”Davvero” (Emma Marrone voice and guitar)
”Maledetto quel giorno”
”Ti capita mai”
”Acqua e ghiaccio”
”Senza averti mai” (Emma Marrone voice and guitar)
”Con le nuvole”
”Nel blu dipinto di blu”
”America”
”Cercavo amore”
”L'amore che ho”
”Tra passione e lacrime”
”Non sono solo te”
”Sembra strano”
”Dalle vene”
”Cullami”
”Resta ancora un po'”
”Arriverà”  (version without the Modà)
”Sarò libera”
”Io son per te l'amore” (Emma Marrone voice and guitar)
”Non è l'inferno”
”Calore”
”Cercavo amore” bis

Band 
 Flavio Pasquetto: electric and acoustic guitars
 Simone De Filippis: electric and acoustic guitars
 Luca Cirillo: keyboard
 Daniele Formica: drums
 Pietro Casadei: electric bass
 Arianna Mereu: vocalist
 Elena Floris: violinist
 Claudia Della Gatta: cello

References

2011 albums
Emma Marrone albums